I Heard Mingus is an album by trumpeter Ted Curson which was recorded in 1980 and first released on the Interplay label.

Track listing
All compositions by Ted Curson except as indicated
 "I Heard Mingus" - 9:04
 "Please, Please, Please Don't Put the Pigsfoot in the Kreplach Soup" - 9:15
 "Lost Her" - 10:01
 "Lin's Garden" (Ted Curson, Graham Collier) - 8:00

Personnel
Ted Curson - trumpet, flugelhorn, piccolo trumpet, percussion
Bill Saxton - tenor saxophone (tracks 2 & 4)
Mike Morgenstern - baritone saxophone (tracks 2 & 4)
Jim McNeely - piano (tracks 2-4)
Ryo Kawasaki - guitar
Mike Richmond - bass, electric bass
Adam Nussbaum - drums
Montego Joe - percussion (track 2 & 4)

References

1980 albums
Ted Curson albums
Interplay Records albums